Shaun R. Harper (born October 26, 1975) is an American scholar on racial equity in the United States. He is a Provost Professor in the Rossier School of Education and the Marshall School of Business at the University of Southern California. In 2022, he was appointed University Professor, a distinction bestowed only to 26 of 4,700 USC full-time faculty. Dr. Harper also is the Clifford and Betty Allen Chair in Urban Leadership, founder and executive director of the USC Race and Equity Center, a past president of the American Educational Research Association, a past president of the Association for the Study of Higher Education, and a 2020-21 editor-at-large of TIME magazine. He spent a decade at the University of Pennsylvania, where he was a tenured professor and founding executive director of the Center for the Study of Race & Equity in Education. He was previously a member of President Barack Obama's My Brother's Keeper Alliance Advisory Council.

Career and research

Harper began his career as a student affairs professional at Indiana University, where he worked in student activities and Greek Life. From 2000 to 2003, he served as Assistant Director of MBA Admissions for the Indiana University Kelley School of Business. In 2003, he became Executive Director of the Doctor of Education (Ed.D.) Programs at the University of Southern California Rossier School of Education, where he also served as an Assistant Professor. He moved to Penn State University in 2005, where he was an Assistant Professor and Research Associate in the Center for the Study of Higher Education. Harper joined the University of Pennsylvania Graduate School of Education faculty in 2007, where he earned tenure and was promoted to Associate Professor in 2011. He founded the Center for the Study of Race & Equity in Education that same year. Penn promoted Harper to Professor in 2016. He returned to the University of Southern California in July 2017 as the Clifford and Betty Allen Chair in Urban Leadership and founding executive director of the USC Race and Equity Center.

Dr. Harper served as the 2020-21 American Educational Research Association and the 2016-17 Association for the Study of Higher Education president. He was inducted into the National Academy of Education in 2021. His research focuses primarily on race, gender, and other dimensions of equity in an array of organizational contexts, including K-12 schools, colleges and universities, and corporations. He has published 12 books and over 100 other academic publications. Review of Research in Education, Harvard Educational Review, Teachers College Record, Journal of Higher Education, Review of Higher Education, and Journal of College Student Development are some journals in which Professor Harper's research is published. His research has been cited in more than 18,000 published studies across a vast array of academic fields and disciplines. Atlantic Philanthropies and the Bill & Melinda Gates, Lumina, Ford, Kellogg, College Futures, Kresge, Sloan, and Open Society Foundations have awarded him more than $18 million in grants.

Professor Harper has testified twice to the United States House of Representatives and spoken at numerous White House convenings. Dr. Harper served on President Barack Obama’s My Brother’s Keeper Advisory Council; on the national education policy committee for the Biden-Harris Campaign; and on California Governor Gavin Newsom’s statewide task force on education, racial equity, and COVID-19 recovery. The recipient of dozens of top honors in his field and three honorary doctorates, Professor Harper has been repeatedly recognized in Education Week as one of the 10 most influential scholars in the field of education.

Select press and media

The New York Times, Los Angeles Times, Washington Post, Wall Street Journal, Sports Illustrated, Chronicle of Higher Education, Inside Higher Ed, and hundreds of other news outlets have quoted Professor Harper and featured his research. He has been interviewed on CNN, ESPN, PBS NewsHour, and NPR.

References

External links
 Google Scholar profile of Shaun R. Harper, Ph.D.

University of Pennsylvania faculty
University of Southern California faculty
People from Thomasville, Georgia
Albany State University alumni
Indiana University staff
Indiana University alumni
1975 births
Living people